Emphasizer is the first full length studio album by Garage A Trois  released in 2003.

Track listing
 "Hard Headed Rio AKA Rio Cuca Dura" - 4:14
 "Sprung Monkey" - 4:39
 "Plena for My Grundle" - 3:40
 "A-Frame" - 3:56
 "We See" - 3:53
 "Interpretive Ape Dance" - 6:16
 "Launch" - 5:02
 "GAT Swamba" - 3:04
 "Delta Skelta" - 5:18
 "House of Hand Wash" - 2:51
Earlier albums have a different ordering with Gat Swamba on track 1, Sprung Monkey on track 6, and Interpretive Ape Dance on track 8.

Personnel
Mike Dillon: percussion, vibraphone, marimba, congas, tabla, timbales, gong, bells, cuica, effects 
Charlie Hunter: 8 string guitar, pandeiro
Stanton Moore: drums and cymbals
Skerik: tenor saxophone, baritone saxophone, suona double reed horn, drum, cracklebox, analog synth, effects, distortion, marimba

References

2003 albums
Garage A Trois albums